MC4 connectors are single-contact electrical connectors commonly used for connecting solar panels. The MC in MC4 stands for the manufacturer Multi-Contact (now Stäubli Electrical Connectors) and the 4 for the 4 mm diameter contact pin. 

MC4s allow strings of panels to be easily constructed by pushing the connectors from adjacent panels together by hand, but require a tool to disconnect them to ensure they do not accidentally disconnect when the cables are pulled. 

The MC4 and compatible products are universal in the solar market today, equipping almost all solar panels produced since about 2011.  Originally rated for 600 V, newer versions are rated at 1500 V, which allows longer strings to be created.

Background
While small solar panels used for battery charging and similar tasks may not require special connectors, larger systems normally connect the panels together in series to form strings. In the past this was accomplished by opening a small electrical box on the back of the panel and connecting user-supplied wires to screw terminals within. However, in the USA, bare terminals of this sort are limited to 50V or less by the National Electrical Code (NEC). Above 50V only a licensed electrician can make the connections . Additionally, these sorts of connections were subject to problems caused by water leakage, electrical corrosion and mechanical stress on the wires.

Starting in the 2000s, a number of companies introduced products to address these issues. In these systems, the junction box was sealed and two wires were permanently attached using strain reliefs. The cables ended with push-fit connectors that met the definition of a convenience receptacle, meaning they could be (legally) connected together by anyone. Two connectors became somewhat common during this period, the Radox connector and MC3 connector, both of which essentially looked like weather-sealed phono jacks.

In 2008 the US Electrical Code was updated to require solar panel connectors to offer "positive locking", so that they were able to be plugged together by hand but only separated again using a tool. Radox, a European manufacturer, did not respond to this specification and has since disappeared from the market. Two US-based companies, Tyco Electronics and Multi-Contact, responded by introducing new connectors to meet this requirement.

Tyco's Solarlok became a market leader for a period in the late 2000s, but a number of factors conspired to push it from the market. Among these was the fact that the system had two sets of cables and wires, which led to considerable annoyance in the field when equipment from different vendors could not be plugged together. By 2011, the MC4 was already in a strong leadership position, which led to the introduction of compatible products from a variety of major connector vendors. Among these are the Amphenol Helios H4 and SMK PV-03.

Description
The MC4 system consists of a plug and socket design. The plugs and sockets are inside plastic shells that appear to be the opposite gender - the plug is inside a cylindrical shell that looks like a female connector but is referred to as male, and the socket is inside a square probe that looks male but is electrically female. The female connector has two plastic fingers that have to be pressed toward the central probe slightly to insert into holes in the front of the male connector. When the two are pushed together, the fingers slide down the holes until they reach a notch in the side of the male connector, where they pop outward to lock the two together.

For a proper seal, MC4s must be used with cable of the correct diameter. The cable is normally double-insulated (insulation plus black sheath) and both UV and higher temperature resistant (most cables deteriorate if used outdoors without protection from sunlight). Connectors are typically attached by crimping, though soldering is also possible.

The MC4 connector is UL rated at 20A and 600V maximum, depending on the conductor size used. Standards efforts in Europe also allow special 1000V versions and 30A or higher when used in pairs.

Application and safety
MC Multilam Technology claims that constant spring pressure provides reliable low contact resistance. However, it is very important to never connect or disconnect them under load, even on low-voltage (12–48V) systems. An electric arc may form which can melt and seriously damage contact materials, resulting in high resistance and subsequent overheating. This is partly because direct current (DC) continues to arc, whereas commonly used alternating current (AC) more readily self-extinguishes at the zero-crossing voltage point. 

Large arrays of panels are commonly interconnected in series, made of strings of panels generating 17 to 50V each, with overall voltages up to 600V per string or 1500V in special large arrays with high voltage panels.

Connectors made by other manufacturers may be mated with original Stäubli parts and are sometimes described as "MC compatible", but may not conform to the requirements for a safe electrical connection with long term stability.

Interruption requires a special DC circuit breaker which allows opening the circuit without arc damage. Typical 120/230V AC switches and circuit breakers are not generally suited for DC applications or may work at much lower currents.

See also
Daisy chain (electrical engineering)
DC connector

References

External links
 

Solar panel connectors